Kenneth Herbert Clarke (born 23 May 1949) is the former Mission Director of SAMS UK & Ireland.  He was Bishop of Kilmore, Elphin and Ardagh from 2001 until 2012.

Biography
Clarke grew up in Holywood, Co. Down, Northern Ireland and was educated at Sullivan Upper School and Trinity College, Dublin, and  ordained in 1972, his first posts were curacies at  Magheralin and Dundonald. He then served as a missionary in Chile, following which he was Rector of  Crinken Church, Dublin, and then Rector of Coleraine and Archdeacon of Dalriada before elevation to the episcopate as the 17th bishop of the Diocese of Kilmore, Elphin and Ardagh in the Church of Ireland.

Bishop Clarke is married to Helen and they have four daughters.

Bishop Clarke became a patron of the Iona Institute  in 2014. He is a supporter and patron of the New Wine Group.

Publications
 Going for Growth by Ken Clarke (2011)

References

1949 births
People educated at Sullivan Upper School
Alumni of Trinity College Dublin
21st-century Anglican bishops in Ireland
Bishops of Kilmore, Elphin and Ardagh
Living people
People from County Down
Evangelical Anglican bishops